North Muddy Township is one of eleven townships in Jasper County, Illinois, USA.  As of the 2010 census, its population was 777 and it contained 328 housing units.

Geography

Cities, towns, villages
 Wheeler

Unincorporated towns
 Latona at 
(This list is based on USGS data and may include former settlements.)

Adjacent townships
 Grove Township (north)
 Wade Township (east)
 Smallwood Township (southeast)
 South Muddy Township (south)
 Lucas Township, Effingham County (southwest)
 Bishop Township, Effingham County (west)
 St. Francis Township, Effingham County (northwest)

Cemeteries
The township contains these five cemeteries: Bailey, Slate Point, Texler/Kedron/Toland Grove, Wheeler Family and Wheeler.

Major highways
  Illinois Route 33

Demographics

School districts
 Dieterich Community Unit School District 30
 Jasper County Community Unit School District 1

Political districts
 Illinois' 19th congressional district
 State House District 108
 State Senate District 54

References
 
 United States Census Bureau 2007 TIGER/Line Shapefiles
 United States National Atlas

External links
 City-Data.com
 Illinois State Archives

Townships in Jasper County, Illinois
1859 establishments in Illinois
Populated places established in 1859
Townships in Illinois